Tragurium, Ancient Latin name of a city in Dalmatia (coastal Croatia), now called Trogir, was a bishopric until 1829 and a Latin titular bishopric until 1933.

History 
In 1050 Tragurium became the seat of a diocese also known as Traù (in curiate Italian) or Trogir in  Croatian.

On 1 May 1298 it lost territory to establish the Diocese of Šibenik.

On 30 June 1828, the residential see was abolished by papal bull Locum Beati Petri, a Croatian dioceses reshuffle, which divided its territory over the then Roman Catholic Diocese of Split–Makarska and its own above daughter Šibenik.

Residential suffragan bishops 
 Petrus (970-?)
 Saint John of Trogir, actually Giovanny, from Osor (1062 - death 14.11.1111)
 Anonim (1112 -?)
 sede vacante (1123-1151?)
 Dessa Maccarelli, from Tragurium (1151-1180, elected only)
 Michael, from Tragurium (1180-1206), previously Coadjutor Bishop of Traù (? – 1180?)
Treguanus alias Treguano, from Florence (1206 - death 1254)
 Columbanus alias fra Columbano, from Rab, Friars Minor (O.F.M.) (1255-1277)
 Joannes II (1277-?)
 Gregorius Machinatura, from Tragurium (1282 - death 1297)
 Liberio, from Ancona (Italy, 1297 - death 1319)
 Lampridio Vitturi, from Tragurium (1320 - death 1348) 
 fra Bartolomeo, from Vallismontana (1349 - death 1361?), previously Bishop of Kotor (Montenegro) (1348.07.14 – 1349.01.30)
 Niccolò de' Casotti (Nikola Kažotić), from Tragurium (1361 - death 1370)
 Valentinus (1370-?)
 Crisogono (Krševan) de Dominis (14 July 1372 - 1403), from and previously Bishop of the Roman Catholic Diocese of Arba (Rab) (1363.06.07 – 1372.07.14); later Metropolitan Archbishop of Kalocsa (Hungary, plausibly not possessed as he died the same year) 
 Simone (Šimun) de Dominis, from Rab (1403 - death 1420?)
Marino de Cernotis  (Carnota), from Rab (1423 - 1424), previously Bishop of Arba (1414.02.11 – 1423.05.07); later bishop of Trieste (Italy, 1424.12.11 – death 1441)
 fra Tommaso Tomasini from Tuscia, Dominicans (O.P.) (1424 - 1435), previously Bishop of Cittanova (d'Istria) (Croatia, 1409 – 1420.03.04), Bishop of Pula (Croatia) (1420.03.04 – 1423.09.24), Bishop of Roman Catholic Diocese of Urbino (Italy) (1423.09.24 – 1424.12.11); later bishop of Recanati (Italy, 1435.10.24 – 1440.10.15), then Bishop of Feltre (Italy) (1440.10.15 – 1446.03.24)
 Ludovico (Trevisan) Scarampi Mezzarota, from Padua (Italy, 1435 - 1437), later Metropolitan Archbishop of Firenze (Florence) (Italy) (1437.08.06 – 1439.12.18), Patriarch of Aquileia (Italy) (1439.12.18 – 1465.03.22), created Cardinal-Priest of San Lorenzo in Damaso (1440.07.01 – 1465.01.07), Chamberlain of the Holy Roman Church of Reverend Apostolic Camera (1440 – death 1465.03.22)
 Giovanni Vitelleschi, Apostolic administrator or Bishop, according to the source, 1437 - 1440); previously Bishop of Macerata (Italy) (1431.04.16 – 1435.10.12), Titular Patriarch of Alexandria (1435.02.21 – death 1440.04.02), Metropolitan Archbishop of Firenze (Florence) (Italy) (1435.10.12 – 1437.08.09); also Cardinal-Priest of San Lorenzo in Lucina (1437.08.09 – 1440.04.02), Archpriest of the Roman Papal Basilica of St. Mary Major (1439 – 1440.04.02)
 Angelo Cavazza from Venice (1440 - death 1452), previously Bishop of Arba (1428.02.23 – 1433.01.07), Bishop of Poreč–Novigrad (Croatia) (1433.01.07 – 1440.04.11)
 Giacomo Trugloni, from Ancona (Italy, 1452 - death 1483) 
 Leonello Chiericato, from Vicenza (Italy, 1484 - 1488), previously Bishop of Arba (1472.01.08 – 1484.01.19); later bishop of Concordia (1488.10.22 – death 1506.08.19)
 Francesco Marcelli, from Venice (1488 - death 1524)
 Toma Niger (Tommaso de Nigris) from Split (1524-1525), alias Tommaso de Nigris, previously Bishop of Skradin (1520.01.11 – 1524.09.02) ***
 Cristoforo de Baptistis (Niger) alias Cristoforo de Nigris, from Split (Croatia, 1525.06.07 - death 1559.11.25)
 Federico Cornaro from Venice (1560-1561), later Bishop of Bergamo (Italy) (1561.01.15 – 1577.07.19), Bishop of Padua (Italy) (1577.07.19 – 1590.10.04), created Cardinal-Priest of San Stefano al Monte Celio (1586.01.15 – 1590.10.04)
 apostolic administrator (1561-1567) Alvise cardinal Corner from Venice ***
 Tommaso Sperandio Corbelli, from Fano (Italy, 1567 - 1574)
 Antonio Guidi, from Mantua (Italy, 1574 - 1604)
 Martius Andreucci, from Udine (Italy, 1604 - 1622)
 Pace Giordano (Pax Jordanus) (1623-1649) from Vicenza (1623-1649)
 sede vacante (1649-1654) Francesco Coccalini, from Venice (1654 - 1661)
 Giovanni Paolo Garzoni, from Venice (1663 - 1675)
 Giovanni de Andreis, from Trogir (1676 - 1683)
 Joannes Cuppari (Ivan Cupareo), from Split (1684 - 1694)
 Joseph Simeon Cavagnini, from Split (1695 - 1698)
 Stefano Cupilli, from Venice (1699 - 1708 transferred to the see of Split)
 Pietro Paolo Calorio (Calore), from Venice (1708 - 1713 transferred to the see of Krk, Criatia)
 fra Michael Angelus Farfulfi (Michelangelo Farolfi), from  Candia (Heraklion) (Crte, Greece, 1713 - 1715)
 Ivan Vidović (Jean Vidovich) from Šibenik (1716 - 1721)
Ante Kadčić (Antoine Kacich) from Makarska (1722 – 1730 transferred to the see of Split)
 fra Giuseppe Caccia, from Venice (1731 - 1737)
Gerolamo Fonda from Piran (1738 - 1754)
 Didak Manola (Diego Manola), from Split (1755 - 1765)
 Ivan Antun Miočević (Johann Anton Miocevich), from Šibenik (Croatia, 1766 - 1786)
 Lelio Cippico, from Trogir (accepted 1783 the transfer from the see of Šibenik when Miočević was to be transferred to the see of Split – 1784 transferred to the see of Split)
 Antonio Belglava (Antun Belglava), from Zadar (Croatia, 1787 - 1789)
 Giovanni Pietro Galzigna, from Rab (1790 - 1795 transferred to the see of  Rab)
 Giovanni Antonio Pinelli, from Trogir (1795 - 1821)
 sede vacante (1821-1828)''

Titular see 
Since 1933 the bishopric was nominally restored and is on the Catholic Church's list of titular sees.

It has had the following incumbents, all of the lowest (episcopal) rank : 
 Frans Joseph Bruls Canisius, Montfort Missionaries (S.M.M.) (26 April 1969 - 7 January 1976) as emeritate; previously Titular Bishop of Parætonium (1939.01.07 – 1964.02.11) & Coadjutor Apostolic Vicar of Los Llanos de San Martín (Colombia) (1939.01.07 – 1939.06.27) succeeding as Vicar Apostolic of Los Llanos de San Martín (1939.06.27 – 1949.06.09), last Apostolic Vicar of Villavicencio (Colombia) (1949.06.09 – 1964.02.11), promoted first Bishop of Villavicencio (1964.02.11 – 1969.04.26)
 Thaddeus Anthony Shubsda (20 December 1976 - 26 May 1982 named Bishop of Monterey)
 Dale Joseph Melczek (3 December 1982 - 28 October 1995 named Coadjutor Bishop of Gary)
 Pierre Farine (12 August 1996 - ), Auxiliary Bishop emeritus of Lausanne, Geneva and Fribourg (Switzerland)

See also 
Catholic Church in Croatia

Notes

External links 
 GigaCatholic, with incumbent biography links

Catholic titular sees in Europe
1828 disestablishments
Former Roman Catholic dioceses in Croatia
Diocese